Memorial Park Cemetery also known as Pioneer Cemetery and Old Albany Cemetery is a cemetery located along Middleton Road in the city of Albany in the Great Southern region of Western Australia.

It was constructed in 1836 and is the first consecrated cemetery in Western Australia, gazetted in 1840 as a public burial ground to provide for the needs of a growing community. It was closed as a public cemetery in 1959, with a few burials being held there until 2000 and ashes placed there until 2009. Most burials now being held at Allambie Park Cemetery. It is thought to be the longest serving public cemetery in Western Australia.

It is composed of two parts, the upper cemetery and the lower cemetery, separated by Middleton Road. Easily accessed by pedestrians the site has a number of mature native and exotic trees and a range of diversity, style and age of memorials and grave fittings on the plots.

Classified by the National Trust in 2000, the cemetery was listed on the permanent register of the Heritage Council of Western Australia in 2003.

Notable burials
 Francis Bird
 Henry Camfield
 John Wollaston
 Alexander Collie
 Alexander Cockburn-Campbell
 Spencer family
 Hassell family
 William Grills Knight
 Moir family
 Robert Andrew Muir

See also
 List of places on the State Register of Heritage Places in the City of Albany

References

Heritage places in Albany, Western Australia
Cemeteries in Western Australia
Middleton Road, Albany
1836 establishments in Australia
State Register of Heritage Places in the City of Albany